Heist is an American crime drama television series that premiered on NBC on March 22, 2006, but was almost immediately canceled on April 19, 2006, due to low ratings. The series was from director Doug Liman and revolved around professional thief Mickey O' Neil (Dougray Scott), who created a team of experts to try to pull off the biggest heist in history — to simultaneously rob three jewelry stores on Rodeo Drive during Academy Awards week. Meanwhile, Amy Sykes (Michele Hicks), lead detective for LAPD's Robbery Division, led the task force investigating a series of thefts committed by this new crew. Under high pressure from her superiors, she had to figure out not only who was behind the crimes, but also what larger job they were leading up to.

Cast
Dougray Scott as Mickey O'Neil
Michele Hicks as Amy Sykes
Steve Harris as James Johnson
Seymour Cassel as Pops
Marika Dominczyk as Lola
Billy Gardell as Detective Billy O'Brien
David Walton as Ricky
Reno Wilson as Detective Tyrese Evans

Reception 
Metacritic gave the series 51 out of 100, from 22 reviews. Alessandra Stanley of The New York Times found "the story lines and characters are layered and more intricate than in most detective series" and compared Heist to the British show Hustle. Matthew Gilbert of The Boston Globe, in reviewing the two new shows premiering that night, Heist and The Evidence, declared "Heist is the better of the dramas."  He likened both series to the work of Quentin Tarantino, saying they "have Pulp Fiction and Reservoir Dogs in their DNA." Tim Goodman of The San Francisco Chronicle found "the writing in Heist is self-consciously forced", further describing it as "painful to hear". "Heist is either the best inside joke about appeasing the masses for a monolithic network or, sadly, two guys who needed to pay the rent and buy mama some shoes." Tom Shales of The Washington Post describes this serialized drama as "confusingly shot and edited, populated with snarlingly cranky characters, and crowded with cheap tricks designed to alleviate the show's prevailing pall."

Episodes

References

External links
 

Television series created by the Cullen Brothers
NBC original programming
Television series by Sony Pictures Television
Television series by Universal Television
Television shows set in Los Angeles
2000s American crime drama television series
2006 American television series debuts
2006 American television series endings
Heist fiction